Handale Priory (also called Grendale) was a priory of Cistercian nuns in Handale, North Yorkshire, England. It was founded in 1133 by William, son of Roger de Percy, and was dissolved in 1539. A fishpond survives and a farmhouse built on the site in the 18th century may incorporate part of the priory.

References

Monasteries in North Yorkshire
1133 establishments in England
Christian monasteries established in the 12th century
Cistercian nunneries in England
Loftus, North Yorkshire